The discography of American rapper Nipsey Hussle consists of one studio album, 54 singles (including 22 as a featured artist), three compilation mixtapes and 14 mixtapes, including The Marathon, The Marathon Continues and Crenshaw. His debut studio album Victory Lap was released on February 16, 2018.

Albums

Studio albums

Compilation mixtapes

Mixtapes

Singles

As lead artist

As featured artist

Other charted and/or certified songs

Guest appearances

Notes

References

Discographies of American artists
Hip hop discographies